The members of the 6th General Assembly of Newfoundland were elected in the Newfoundland general election held in May 1855. The general assembly sat from 1855 to 1859.

This was the first election held after responsible government was granted to the colony. The Liberal Party led by Philip Francis Little won the election and Little became Newfoundland's first premier. After Little resigned as leader in 1858, John Kent served as premier.

Ambrose Shea was chosen as speaker.

Sir Charles Henry Darling served as colonial governor of Newfoundland until February 1857, when he was named governor of Jamaica. Later that year, Darling was succeeded by Sir Alexander Bannerman,

Members of the Assembly 
The following members were elected to the assembly in 1855:

Notes:

By-elections 
By-elections were held to replace members for various reasons:

Notes:

References 

Newfoundland
006
1855 establishments in the British Empire